Svetlana Nikolayevna Mironova (born 20 August 1986) is a Russian orienteering competitor. She won a gold medal in the relay at the 2012 European Orienteering Championships in Falun.

She competed at the 2012 World Orienteering Championships. In the middle distance she qualified for the final, where she placed 21st.

References

External links
 

1986 births
Living people
Russian orienteers
Female orienteers
Foot orienteers
World Orienteering Championships medalists
Sportspeople from Nizhny Novgorod
21st-century Russian women